St. Ann's Catholic Church of Badus is a historic church in Ramona, South Dakota. It was built in 1884 and was added to the National Register in 1979.

History
The area was settled by 10 Swiss immigrants who relocated to Lake Badus from Stillwater, Minnesota in 1877, naming the lake after a lake near Piz Badus. The community celebrated its first Mass and baptism on May 20, 1880, joined by Irish settlers from elsewhere in Nunda Township. Plans to build a permanent church began in 1883, and were realized in 1884.

The routing of the Milwaukee Road through Ramona led to faster growth there; St. William of Vercelli there was split off as its own parish in 1898. St. Ann's was closed for regular services in 1965, although it remains in use as a summer chapel and for a special celebration on the Feast of St. Ann in July.

Architecture
It is a one-story vernacular-Gothic Revival building with a gable roof and clapboard siding.  It is west-facing with four bays on its north and south sides, and it has Gothic-style tracery within pointed arches of its windows.

References

Churches in the Roman Catholic Diocese of Sioux Falls
Former Roman Catholic church buildings in South Dakota
Churches on the National Register of Historic Places in South Dakota
Gothic Revival church buildings in South Dakota
Roman Catholic churches completed in 1884
Churches in Lake County, South Dakota
National Register of Historic Places in Lake County, South Dakota
19th-century Roman Catholic church buildings in the United States
Religious organizations disestablished in 1965
Religious organizations established in 1880
Swiss-American history